John Francis "Jules" Caesar (5 January 1917 – 18 June 2004) was an Australian rules footballer who played for Essendon in the Victorian Football League (VFL).

Recruited from Ascot Vale, Caesar was a wingman in Essendon's 1942 premiership team, after playing in a Grand Final loss the previous year. He fought in the Pacific Islands during the war and played at Yarraville when he returned in 1946.

References

Holmesby, Russell and Main, Jim (2007). The Encyclopedia of AFL Footballers. 7th ed. Melbourne: Bas Publishing.

1917 births
2004 deaths
Essendon Football Club players
Essendon Football Club Premiership players
Yarraville Football Club players
Australian rules footballers from Victoria (Australia)
One-time VFL/AFL Premiership players